Sentinel Peak is a  mountain summit located in the Olympic Mountains, in Jefferson County of Washington state. Rising in the center of Olympic National Park, its nearest higher neighbor is Mount Fromme,  to the northwest. Precipitation runoff from the peak drains to Hood Canal via the Dosewallips River.

Climate

Based on the Köppen climate classification, Sentinel Peak is located in the marine west coast climate zone of western North America. Most weather fronts originate in the Pacific Ocean, and travel northeast toward the Olympic Mountains. As fronts approach, they are forced upward by the peaks of the Olympic Range, causing them to drop their moisture in the form of rain or snowfall (Orographic lift). As a result, the Olympics experience high precipitation, especially during the winter months. During winter months, weather is usually cloudy, but due to high pressure systems over the Pacific Ocean that intensify during summer months, there is often little or no cloud cover during the summer. The months July through September offer the most favorable weather for viewing or climbing this peak.

Geology

The Olympic Mountains are composed of obducted clastic wedge material and oceanic crust, primarily Eocene sandstone, turbidite, and basaltic oceanic crust. The mountains were sculpted during the Pleistocene era by erosion and glaciers advancing and retreating multiple times.

See also

 Olympic Mountains
 Geology of the Pacific Northwest
 Geography of Washington (state)

References

External links 
 Sentinel Peak weather: Mountain Forecast
 PBase photo: Sentinel Peak and Mt. Fromme

Mountains of Washington (state)
Mountains of Jefferson County, Washington
Olympic Mountains
Landforms of Olympic National Park
North American 2000 m summits